is a unit of the Fleet Air Force of the Japan Maritime Self-Defense Force. It is based at Naval Air Facility Atsugi in Kanagawa Prefecture. It consists of Air Patrol Squadron 3, the Atsugi Base Squadron and the Iwo Jima Base Squadron (With a detachment on Minami-Tori-shima (Marcus Is.).

References

Aviation in Japan
Units and formations of the Japan Maritime Self-Defense Force